Alice in Wonderland is a graphic adventure game developed by Dale Disharoon and published by Windham Classics for the Apple II and Commodore 64 in 1985. It is an adaptation of Alice's Adventures in Wonderland.
It has a re-make for the philips cd-i.

Reception

Alice in Wonderland was positively received by press, including a score of 8/10 in Computer and Video Games.

References

External links

Alice in Wonderland at Lemon64

1985 video games
Adventure games
Apple II games
Commodore 64 games
Single-player video games
Video games based on Alice in Wonderland
Video games developed in the United States